Rivaldo Barbosa de Souza (born 25 August 1985), simply known as Rivaldo, is a Brazilian retired footballer who played as a defensive midfielder or left back.

Club career
Rivaldo played for clubs in São Paulo state before moved to Bahia on 27 December 2007. After playing 7 games at Brazilian Série B, he moved to Vaduz on 23 July 2008. Then he joined Brazilian football league Sport and after a year he moved to Figueirense FC. On 20 July 2015, Rivaldo joined Persian Gulf Pro League Club Esteghlal.

References

External links
 Contract Archive at CBF
 Profile at Super League
 FC Vaduz profile

1985 births
Living people
Sportspeople from Pernambuco
Brazilian footballers
Association football midfielders
Santos FC players
Guarani FC players
Marília Atlético Clube players
Esporte Clube Bahia players
FC Vaduz players
Oeste Futebol Clube players
Avaí FC players
Sociedade Esportiva Palmeiras players
Sport Club do Recife players
Figueirense FC players
Esteghlal F.C. players
Clube de Regatas Brasil players
Campeonato Brasileiro Série A players
Campeonato Brasileiro Série B players
Campeonato Brasileiro Série C players
Swiss Super League players
Persian Gulf Pro League players
Brazilian expatriate footballers
Brazilian expatriate sportspeople in Liechtenstein
Brazilian expatriate sportspeople in Iran
Expatriate footballers in Liechtenstein
Expatriate footballers in Iran